Virginia Greville is the former Chief Executive Officer of Trade and Investment Queensland and was an Australian ambassador. She served as Australia's ambassador to Spain, (1 May 2015 – 25 May 2018) Andorra and Equatorial Guinea.  She was also Australia’s Ambassador to Chile, Peru, Bolivia, Colombia, Ecuador and Venezuela (2009–2012).

Greville earned a Bachelor of Arts degree from the University of Queensland and a Graduate Diploma in Public Law from the Australian National University.

References

Australian women ambassadors
Ambassadors of Australia to Spain
Ambassadors of Australia to Chile
Australian women chief executives
Ambassadors of Australia to Peru
Ambassadors of Australia to Colombia
Ambassadors of Australia to Venezuela
Ambassadors of Australia to Andorra
Ambassadors of Australia to Equatorial Guinea
Ambassadors of Australia to Bolivia
Ambassadors of Australia to Ecuador
University of Queensland alumni
Australian National University alumni
Year of birth missing (living people)
Living people